The Roman Catholic Diocese of Grand Rapids is a diocese of the Roman Catholic Church in West Michigan in the United States. It comprises 80 parishes in 11 counties It is a suffragan see to the Archdiocese of Detroit.  The mother church of the diocese is the Cathedral of Saint Andrew in Grand Rapids.  On April 18, 2013, Pope Francis appointed Reverend David J. Walkowiak to be the twelfth bishop of Grand Rapids.

History

1700 to 1882 
During the 17th century, present-day Michigan was part of the French colony of New France. The Diocese of Quebec had jurisdiction over the region. In 1763, the Michigan area became part of the British Province of Quebec, forbidden from settlement by American colonists. After the American Revolution, the Michigan region became part of the new United States.  For Catholics, Michigan was now under the jurisdiction of the Archdiocese of Baltimore, which then comprised the entire country.

In 1808, Pope Pius VII erected the Diocese of Bardstown in Kentucky, with jurisdiction over the new Michigan Territory. On June 19, 1821, the pope erected the Diocese of Cincinnati, taking the Michigan Territory from the Diocese of Bardstown.Pope Gregory XVI formed the Diocese of Detroit on March 8, 1833, covering the entire Michigan Territory. 

In 1833, missionary Reverend Frederick Baraga established the first permanent Catholic mission in Grand Rapids. The first resident priest in the area was Father Andrew Viszosky.  Mission stations were later established at Beaver Island, Grand Traverse, Cheboygan, Manistee, Muskegon, Grand Haven and Ionia.

1882 to 1969 
Pope Leo XIII erected the Diocese of Grand Rapids on May 19, 1882, taking its territory in central and western Michigan from the Diocese of Detroit. The pope named Reverend Henry Richter of the Archdiocese of Cincinnati as the first bishop of Grand Rapids. Pope Benedict XV named Michael Gallagher as coadjutor bishop of the diocese in 1915 to assist Richter.  When Richter became bishop, the diocese had 36 priests, 33 churches, 17 parochial schools, and 50,000 Catholics; by the time of his death in 1916, there were 75 priests, 56 churches, 38 parochial schools, and over 150,000 Catholics. After Richter's death, Gallagher automatically succeeded him as bishop of Grand Rapids.

Gallagher served in Grand Rapids less than two years before being appointed bishop of the Diocese of Detroit by Benedict XV in 1918.  The pope appointed Auxiliary Bishop Edward D. Kelly from the Diocese of Detroit to replace Gallagher in Rapid City.  Kelly died in 1926. On June 25, 1926, Pope Pius XI appointed Bishop Joseph G. Pinten of the Diocese of Superior as the fourth bishop of Grand Rapids.In 1938, the Diocese of Grand Rapids lost territory when Pope Pius XII established the Diocese of Saginaw. 

After Pinten retired in 1940, Pius XII named Bishop Joseph C. Plagens of the Diocese of Sault Sainte Marie-Marquette to lead the Diocese of Grand Rapids on December 16, 1940. Plagens died after less than three years in office. Reverend Francis J. Haas of the Archdiocese of Milwaukee was the next bishop in Grand Rapids, appointed by Pius XII in 1943.  Haas served the diocese for ten years until his death in 1953. On March 23, 1954, Pius XII appointed Auxiliary Bishop Allen James Babcock of the Archdiocese of Detroit as bishop of the Diocese of Grand Rapids.Babcock died in 1969.

1969 to 1989 
On October 15, 1969, Auxiliary Bishop Joseph M. Breitenbeck of the Archdiocese of Detroit was appointed the eighth bishop of Grand Rapids by Pope Paul VI. In 1970, Paul VI created both the Diocese of Gaylord to its north and the Diocese of Kalamazoo to its south, taking territory from the Diocese of Grand Rapids.  Breitenbeck played a major role in preparing the two new dioceses 

During his tenure in Grand Rapids, Breitenbeck vigorously implemented the reforms of the Second Vatican Council. He also encouraged the practice of communal confessions, and allowed divorced and remarried Catholics to receive the sacraments. Some parishes strongly resisted changing the language of the mass from Latin to English; St. Isidore's Church even took Breitenbeck and the diocese to court over the issue.  

In his 19 years as bishop, Breitenbeck oversaw the establishment of seven new parishes. St. Adalbert Church in Grand Rapids was raised to the rank of minor basilica by Pope John Paul II in 1979.In the 1980's, Breitenbeck created policies and procedures for handling allegations of clerical sexual abuse; these rules remained in force until major revisions in the early 21st century. Having a sister with developmental disabilities led him to establish a ministry to help people with disabilities. He also helped establish the Deposit & Loan Cooperative Investment Program, which allowed parishes to borrow money from diocesan funds at a lower interest rate, and supported the Michigan Catholic Conference's efforts to provide retirement benefits for priests and laity. He instituted regular changes and appointments of pastors and oversaw one of the renovations of the Cathedral of St. Andrew.Instead of living at the episcopal residence, Breitenbeck sold it and moved into a modest home in Grattan Township. He retired as bishop in 1989.

1989 to present 
On June 24, 1989, John Paul II appointed Bishop Robert Rose of the Diocese of Gaylord as the ninth bishop of the Diocese of Grand Rapids. Rose created lay leadership programs, revamped the Hispanic ministry and presented forums and events focused on racism in the diocese. He established the Catholic Foundation of West Michigan among other institutions. In 2002, John Paul II appointed Auxiliary Bishop Kevin Britt of the Archdiocese of Detroit as coadjutor bishop of the diocese to assist Rose.

After Rose retired in 2003, Britt automatically succeeded him as bishop. Seven months later, Britt died. In 2005,  Pope Benedict XVI named Auxiliary Bishop Walter A. Hurley of the Archdiocese of Detroit as the 11th bishop of Grand Rapids. He retired in 2012 and Benedict XVI appointed Reverend David Walkowiak of the Archdiocese of Detroit to replace Hurley,  Walkowiak is the current bishop of Grand Rapids.

Walkowiak released a statement on November 27, 2019, supporting the decision of Scott Nolan, pastor of St. Stephen Parish in East Grand Rapids, Michigan, to withhold the eucharist from Sara Smolenski.  A town judge, Smolenski told the local media that Nolan notified her before mass that she could not receive communion because of her same-sex marriage.  She also said that Nolan had given her communion the week before.

Sex abuse
In 2002, the Diocese of Grand Rapids acknowledged that it had paid a $500,000 settlement in 1994 to three women who were sexually abused as minors by John Thomas Sullivan, a diocesan priest, during the late 1950's.  The women did not report the crimes to the diocese until 1993.  Records showed that Bishop Babcock had accepted Sullivan into the diocese even though Sullivan had previously fathered a child in the Diocese of Manchester. Bishop Rose said that the diocese should have never accepted Sullivan.

On May 6, 2021, Grand Haven retired priest Fr. William Langlois was defrocked after sexual abuse allegations against him were deemed as "credible."The diocese has received allegations in 2018 that Langlois had sexually abused a parishioner when they were a minor between 1999 and 2006.  The diocese immediately suspended Langlois, notified local authorities, and started an internal investigation.

Churches

Bishops

Bishops of Grand Rapids
 Henry J. Richter (1883–1916)
 Michael J. Gallagher (1916–1918, coadjutor bishop 1915–1916), appointed Bishop of Detroit
 Edward D. Kelly (1919–1926)
 Joseph G. Pinten (1926–1940)
 Joseph C. Plagens (1941–1943)
 Francis J. Haas (1943–1953)
 Allen J. Babcock (1954–1969)
 Joseph M. Breitenbeck (1969–1989)
 Robert J. Rose (1989–2003)
 Kevin M. Britt (2003–2004; coadjutor bishop 2002–2003)
 Walter A. Hurley (2005–2013)
 David J. Walkowiak (2013–present)

Former Auxiliary Bishops of Grand Rapids
 Joseph Schrembs (1911), appointed Bishop of Toledo and later Bishop of Cleveland
 Charles Salatka (1962–1968), appointed Bishop of Marquette and later Archbishop of Oklahoma City
 Joseph Crescent McKinney (1968–2001)

High schools
 Catholic Central High School, Grand Rapids
 Muskegon Catholic Central High School, Muskegon
 St. Patrick High School, Portland
 West Catholic High School, Grand Rapids
 Sacred Heart Academy Classical High School, Grand Rapids

See also
 Catholic Church by country
 Catholic Church hierarchy
 List of the Catholic dioceses of the United States

References

External links

Roman Catholic Diocese of Grand Rapids Official Site 
Catholic Hierarchy: Diocese of Grand Rapids
WOOD TV8: Hurley named Bishop of Grand Rapids 

 
Religious organizations established in 1882
West Michigan
Roman Catholic Diocese
Roman Catholic dioceses and prelatures established in the 19th century
Grand Rapids
Catholic Church in Michigan
1882 establishments in Michigan